Propallylonal (trade names Nostal, Quietal, Ibomal) is a barbiturate derivative invented in the 1920s. It has sedative, hypnotic and anticonvulsant properties, and is still rarely prescribed as a sleeping medication in some Eastern-European countries.

References 

Barbiturates
Organobromides
Alkene derivatives
GABAA receptor positive allosteric modulators